
Year 778 (DCCLXXVIII) was a common year starting on Thursday  of the Julian calendar. The denomination 778 for this year has been used since the early medieval period, when the Anno Domini calendar era became the prevalent method in Europe for naming years.

Events 
 By place 

 Arab Caliphate and Byzantine Empire 
 Arab–Byzantine War: Emperor Leo IV ("the Khazar") repulses an Abbasid invasion in Anatolia. A Byzantine expeditionary force under Michael Lachanodrakon, military governor (strategos) of the Thracesian Theme, defeats the Muslim-Arabs at the fortress city of Germanikeia in Cilicia (modern Turkey). He plunders the region and takes many captives, mostly Jacobites, who are resettled in Thrace.

 Europe 
 A Frankish army (supported by Burgundians, Bavarians, Bretons, Lombards, and Visigoths) under King Charlemagne invades Al-Andalus (modern Spain), and conquers the cities of Pamplona and Barcelona. However, the Franks are halted at Zaragoza, in the thughur or frontier zone of the Emirate of Córdoba. 
 August 15 – Battle of Roncevaux Pass (Pyrenees): Charlemagne is defeated by the Basques. Among those killed is Roland, governor of the Breton March, who will be immortalized in the 11th century epic The Song of Roland. This marks the beginning of medieval French literature.
 Saxon Wars: Widukind and his close followers return to Saxony from Denmark. He probably makes alliances with the Danes and the northwestern Slav tribes. Saxon rebels destroy the fortress of Karlsburg and sack Deutz (near Cologne), but are unable to cross the Rhine. They are driven back by the garrison of Koblenz, but then ambush and defeat the Frankish pursuers. Counter-attacking Frankish forces pursue the Saxons up the Lahn Valley, and defeat them near Leisa.

 Britain 
 Unrest in Northumbria leads to King Æthelred I ordering the execution of three of his dukes. This considerably weakens his position (approximate date).

 By topic 
 Religion 
 Saxon raiders destroy many churches deep in Frankish territory. The Benedictine monks of Fulda Abbey (modern-day Hesse) hurriedly carry the relics of Saint Boniface over the Rhön Mountains to safety. 
 In Japan, the Kiyomizu-dera Buddhist temple is founded in Kyoto. Its main hall (Hondo) is built in 1633 without a single nail.

Births 
 Ali ibn al-Madini, Muslim scholar (d. 849)
 Bernard, bishop of Vienne (d. 842) 
 Ermengarde of Hesbaye, queen of the Franks (d. 818)
 Ishaq ibn Rahwayh, Muslim scholar and imam (or 777)
 Li Gongzuo, Chinese writer (d. 848)
 Li Shigu, general of the Tang Dynasty (d. 806)
 Liu Gongquan, Chinese calligrapher (d. 865)
 Louis the Pious, king of the Franks (d. 840)
 Rotrude, Frankish princess, daughter of Charlemagne (or 775)
 Xian Zong, emperor of the Tang Dynasty (d. 820)
 Zhaozhou, Chinese Zen Buddhist master (d. 897)

Deaths 
 August 15 – Roland, Frankish military leader
 Áed Find, king of Dál Riata (Scotland)
 Alpín II, king of the Picts
 Berhthun, bishop of Lichfield (approximate date)
 Congalach mac Conaing, king of South Brega (Ireland)
 Eterscél mac Áeda, king of the Uí Cheinnselaig (Ireland) 
 Mac Flaithniadh, abbot of Clonfert (Ireland)
 Niall Frossach, High King of Ireland
 Sufyan al-Thawri, Muslim scholar and jurist (b. 716)

References